Luis Maria Simón is a judge of the United Nations Appeals Tribunal.  He is a native of Uruguay.

Simón is a legal scholar who has written widely on Latin American law.

References

Uruguayan jurists
Uruguayan officials of the United Nations
Living people
Year of birth missing (living people)
Place of birth missing (living people)